Frederick Peters (1851–1919) was a Canadian lawyer and politician.

Frederick Peters may also refer to:

 Frederick Thornton Peters (1889–1942), his son, Canadian recipient of the Victoria Cross
 Frederick Emerson Peters (1885–1959), American fraudster
 Frederick Peters (actor) (1884–1963), American film actor
 F. Whitten Peters (born 1946), District of Columbia lawyer and public official